Department of Higher Education, Odisha (Odia: ଉଚ୍ଚ ଶିକ୍ଷା ବିଭାଗ, ଓଡ଼ିଶା) is a unit of the Government of Odisha in India that looks after the school and college education in the state of Odisha. The department looks after the education curriculum at University, Post-Graduate, Graduate and Higher Secondary level in the state of Odisha. The department is responsible for hiring and employing the Higher Secondary school teachers and college professors employed in Government schools and colleges running under Government of Odisha. Moreover, it looks after functioning of state run Universities namely Ravenshaw University,  Utkal University, Berhampur University, Sambalpur University, Sri Jagannath Sanskrit Viswavidyalaya, North Orissa University, Fakir Mohan University, Gangadhar Meher University, Rama Devi Women's University, Khallikote University, NLUO, Dharanidhar University and Odisha State Open University.

Facility
In the year 2010 Department of Higher Education, Odisha introduced Students Academic Management System also known as (SAMS). This facility is based on e-admission of students seeking admission to ITI/Diploma engineering and non-engineering courses, +2 and +3 courses in various private and government schools, colleges, polytechnics and university in the state of Odisha under Department of Higher Education and skill development in the streams of Arts, Law, Commerce, Science, Craftsmen, ITI training, Diploma and other self finance courses.

DHE Odisha website also enables facility of RTI, e-space, e-dispatch and pool of information resources about staff position and Infrastructure support of various Schools, Colleges and University. E- Dispatch and E- Space are web based facility for receiving Letters, Office Orders, Amendments, and other resources of information of different departments of Government of Odisha.

See also
Council of Higher Secondary Education, Odisha
Board of Secondary Education, Odisha
State Council for Technical Education & Vocational Training

References

 
Government agencies established in 2010
Education in Odisha
State agencies of Odisha
Universities and colleges in Odisha
Government of Odisha
2010 establishments in Orissa